WBE may refer to:
 IBM Websphere Business Events
 Waritai language
Wastewater-based epidemiology
 WENY-DT3, a television station
 Whole brain emulation
 Woman owned business enterprise